George William Pargeter (February 24, 1923 – October 2, 2005) was a Canadian professional ice hockey forward who played four games in the National Hockey League for the Montreal Canadiens. He was born in Calgary, Alberta.

Seasons

External links
 
 Notice of death
 https://www.hhof.com/LegendsOfHockey/jsp/SearchPlayer.jsp?player=13922
 https://www.eliteprospects.com/player/249275/george-pargeter

1923 births
2005 deaths
Buffalo Bisons (AHL) players
Calgary Stampeders (WHL) players
Canadian ice hockey forwards
Fort Worth Rangers players
Houston Huskies players
Ice hockey people from Calgary
Montreal Canadiens players
New Haven Eagles players
Seattle Ironmen players